The Imperfect Lover is a 1921 British silent drama film directed by Walter West and starring Violet Hopson, Stewart Rome and Cameron Carr.

Cast
 Violet Hopson - Noreen Grene 
 Stewart Rome - Robert Lawne 
 Cameron Carr - Captain Sterne 
 Simeon Stuart - Mr. Grene 
 Dennis Esmond - Conrad Grene 
 Pauline Johnson -Barbara Grene

References

External links

1921 films
British silent feature films
1921 drama films
British drama films
1920s English-language films
Broadwest films
Films directed by Walter West
British black-and-white films
Films based on British novels
1920s British films
Silent drama films